The Latin Grammy Award for Record of the Year is an honor presented annually at the Latin Grammy Awards, a ceremony that recognizes excellence and creates a wider awareness of cultural diversity and contributions of Latin recording artists in the United States and internationally. The award is given to the performers, producers, audio engineers and mastering engineer for new songs in Spanish or Portuguese language. The songs included on an album released the previous year of submission are also eligible only if they have not been submitted to competition before. Instrumental songs are also eligible. Due to the increasing musical changes in the industry, from 2012 the category includes 10 nominees, according to a restructuration made by the academy for the four general categories: Song of the Year, Album of the Year, Best New Artist and Record of the Year.

Alejandro Sanz has won the most awards in the category with seven wins out of eleven nominations, including the award received for "La Tortura", his collaboration with Colombian singer-songwriter Shakira. Jorge Drexler has won the award three times. Drexler is followed by Calle 13, Juanes and Shakira with two winning songs. "Livin' la Vida Loca" and "Despacito" by Puerto Rican singers Ricky Martin, and Luis Fonsi and Daddy Yankee, respectively, are the only songs to be nominated for this award in its Spanish-language version and to receive the same distinction for the English language versions. Most nominated songs were recorded in Spanish language, though "Esperando Na Janela" by Gilberto Gil, "Já Sei Namorar" by Tribalistas, "A Festa" by Maria Rita, "Dois Rios" by Skank, "Arlequim Desconhecido" by Ivan Lins and The Metropole Orchestra, "Tua" by Maria Bethânia, "Atrás de Porta" by Ivete Sangalo, "Um Abraçaço" by Caetano Veloso, "Vidas Pra Contar" by Djavan, and "É Fake (Homem Barato)" by Anaadi, recorded in Portuguese language, were also nominated, while "Talvez" by Caetano Veloso and Tom Veloso won in 2021. In 2017, Colombian artist Maluma became the first performer to have three nominated songs in the same year. Rafael Arcaute, Gustavo Santaolalla and Lulo Pérez are the most awarded producers, with two wins, while Benny Faccone, Anibal Kerpel and Thom Russo have received the most awards as engineers/mixers, with two each.

Recipients
An asterisk (*) indicates the composition won Song of the Year as well.

2000s

2010s

2020s

Notes
 Each year is linked to the article about the Latin Grammy Awards held that year.
 Showing the name of the performer, the nominated song and in parentheses the record producer, and engineers/mixers name(s).

See also
 Grammy Award for Record of the Year

References

General
  Note: User must select the "General Field" category as the genre under the search feature.

Specific

External links
Official site of the Latin Grammy Awards

 
Song awards
Record of the Year